Saint-Pierre-le-Vieux is the name of several communes in France:

 Saint-Pierre-le-Vieux, in the Lozère department
 Saint-Pierre-le-Vieux, in the Saône-et-Loire department
 Saint-Pierre-le-Vieux, in the Seine-Maritime department
 Saint-Pierre-le-Vieux, in the Vendée department

Saint-Pierre-le-Vieux is also the name of a church in Strasbourg, France

See also
 Saint-Pierre (disambiguation)